Tore Eriksson (August 7, 1937 – February 17, 2017) was a Swedish biathlete and Olympic medalist. He was born in Transtrand. He received a bronze medal at the 1968 Winter Olympics in Grenoble. He participated on the bronze teams at the 1966 and at the 1967 Biathlon World Championships.

References

1937 births
2017 deaths
People from Malung-Sälen Municipality
Swedish male biathletes
Olympic biathletes of Sweden
Biathletes at the 1968 Winter Olympics
Olympic bronze medalists for Sweden
Olympic medalists in biathlon
Biathlon World Championships medalists
Medalists at the 1968 Winter Olympics
20th-century Swedish people